Penghusuchus is an extinct genus of gavialid crocodylian. It is known from a skeleton found in Upper Miocene rocks of Penghu Island, off Taiwan.  It may be related to two other fossil Asian gavialids: Maomingosuchus petrolica of southeastern China and Toyotamaphimeia machikanensis of Japan. The taxon was described in 2009 by Shan and colleagues; the type species is P. pani.

Below is a cladogram based morphological studies comparing skeletal features that shows Penghusuchus as a member of Tomistominae, related to the false gharial:

Based on morphological studies of extinct taxa, the tomistomines (including the living false gharial) were long thought to be classified as crocodiles and not closely related to gavialoids. However, recent molecular studies using DNA sequencing have consistently indicated that the false gharial (Tomistoma) (and by inference other related extinct forms in Tomistominae) actually belong to Gavialoidea (and Gavialidae).

Below is a cladogram from a 2018 tip dating study by Lee & Yates simultaneously using morphological, molecular (DNA sequencing), and stratigraphic (fossil age) data that shows Penghusuchus as a gavialid, related to both the gharial and the false gharial:

References

Gavialidae
Miocene crocodylomorphs
Miocene reptiles of Asia
Prehistoric pseudosuchian genera
Fossils of Taiwan